Cristian Avram (born 27 July 1994) is a Moldovan footballer who plays as a goalkeeper for Petrocub Hîncești. In his career Avram also played for Academia Chișinău, Dacia Chișinău and Dinamo-Auto Tiraspol.

International career 
At international level Cristian Avram played for U17 and U21 teams of Moldova.

He made his debut for Moldova national football team on 6 June 2021 in a friendly against Azerbaijan.

References

External links 
 

1994 births
Living people
Footballers from Chișinău
Moldovan footballers
Moldova youth international footballers
Moldova under-21 international footballers
Moldova international footballers
Association football goalkeepers
Moldovan Super Liga players
FC Academia Chișinău players
FC Dacia Chișinău players
FC Dinamo-Auto Tiraspol players
CS Petrocub Hîncești players
Liga II players
FC Gloria Buzău players
Moldovan expatriate footballers
Moldovan expatriate sportspeople in Romania
Expatriate footballers in Romania